The Jinan–Guangzhou Expressway, designated as G35 and commonly referred to as the Jiguang Expressway, is an expressway that connects the cities of Jinan, Shandong, China, and Guangzhou, Guangdong. When fully complete, it will be  in length.

The only section of the expressway that is currently still under construction is in Xingning, Guangdong.

References

Chinese national-level expressways
Expressways in Shandong
Expressways in Henan
Expressways in Anhui
Expressways in Jiangxi
Expressways in Guangdong